The women's 81 kilograms competition at the 2021 World Weightlifting Championships was held on 15 December 2021.

Schedule

Medalists

Records

Results

References

Results

Women's 81 kg
World Championships